West Hill High School was the name of two former schools in the neighbourhood of Notre-Dame-de-Grâce (NDG) in Montreal, Quebec, Canada.

The first West Hill High School was opened in 1919 by the Coteau St. Pierre School Commission on West Hill Avenue. It was annexed by the Protestant Board of School Commissioners (PBSC) in 1921. As NDG's population increased, the school was expanded in 1926 and 1931, and plans were announced for building a new high school in NDG.

Construction of the new school was delayed by the Great Depression, World War II, and then the amalgamation of the PBSC into the Protestant School Board of Greater Montreal in 1946. Work began on the school in 1950 at the corner of Somerled and Draper avenues and was completed in 1952. The name of the school was announced as Somerled High School in 1943 but changed to Monklands High School when work was begun.  However, just before opening, its name was changed to West Hill High School.

The original West Hill High School was renamed to Westward School and became a junior high school, for grade 7 and 8 students only.  In 1954, Westward School went back to being a full high school to handle the impact of the baby boom.  In 1955, the school changed its name yet again, this time to Monklands High School, the previous name of the new West Hill High School on Somerled Avenue while it was under construction.

In 1979, the original West Hill High School, known then as Monklands High School, was closed due to a dramatic decline in enrolment.  In 1984, the building was renovated into a seniors residence by the City of Montreal.

The second West Hill High School is now Royal Vale School, part of the English Montreal School Board.

Notable alumni
Doug Harvey, professional hockey player
William Shatner, Canadian actor
Peter Silverman, Canadian Journalist 
 Mutsumi Takahashi
John Taylor, Canadian football player
Arthur Lipsett, Canadian Filmmaker

References

Defunct schools in Canada
High schools in Montreal
Côte-des-Neiges–Notre-Dame-de-Grâce
Educational institutions established in 1919
Educational institutions disestablished in 1979
English-language schools in Quebec
1919 establishments in Quebec